Veblen is a city in Marshall County, South Dakota, United States. The population was 317 at the 2020 census.

Sioux country singer and actor Floyd Red Crow Westerman is buried here at Saint Matthew's Catholic Cemetery.

History
Veblen was laid out in 1900, and named in honor of J. E. Veblen, an early settler.

Geography
Veblen is located at  (45.862802, -97.287146).

Veblen has been assigned the ZIP code 57270 and the FIPS place code 66540.

Demographics

2010 census
At the 2010 census there were 531 people in 151 households, including 72 families, in the city. The racial makup of the city was 37.1% White, 0.2% African American, 12.6% Native American, 47.8% from other races, and 2.3% from two or more races. Hispanic or Latino of any race were 52.9%.

Of the 151 households 25.8% had children under the age of 18 living with them, 31.1% were married couples living together, 10.6% had a female householder with no husband present, 6.0% had a male householder with no wife present, and 52.3% were non-families. 33.8% of households were one person and 16.5% were one person aged 65 or older. The average household size was 3.52 and the average family size was 3.18.

The median age was 28.2 years. 15.6% of residents were under the age of 18; 18.9% were between the ages of 18 and 24; 41% were from 25 to 44; 14.5% were from 45 to 64; and 10.2% were 65 or older. The gender makeup of the city was 70.8% male and 29.2% female.

2000 census
At the 2000 census there were 281 people in 141 households, including 73 families, in the city. The population density was 915.8 people per square mile (350.0/km). There were 167 housing units at an average density of 544.2 per square mile (208.0/km).  The racial makup of the city was 81.49% White, 15.30% Native American, 2.49% from other races, and 0.71% from two or more races. Hispanic or Latino of any race were 2.85%.

Of the 141 households 22.0% had children under the age of 18 living with them, 35.5% were married couples living together, 11.3% had a female householder with no husband present, and 48.2% were non-families. 47.5% of households were one person and 29.1% were one person aged 65 or older. The average household size was 1.99 and the average family size was 2.79.

The age distribution was 25.3% under the age of 18, 5.7% from 18 to 24, 18.5% from 25 to 44, 19.9% from 45 to 64, and 30.6% 65 or older. The median age was 45 years. For every 100 females, there were 87.3 males. For every 100 females age 18 and over, there were 81.0 males.

The median household income was $18,583 and the median family income  was $20,625. Males had a median income of $31,964 versus $16,250 for females. The per capita income for the city was $12,053. About 25.3% of families and 29.7% of the population were below the poverty line, including 41.9% of those under the age of 18 and 23.2% of those 65 or over.

References

Cities in Marshall County, South Dakota
Cities in South Dakota
Populated places established in 1900
1900 establishments in South Dakota